Mauranipur is a constituency of the Uttar Pradesh Legislative Assembly covering the city of Mauranipur in the Jhansi district of Uttar Pradesh, India.

Mauranipur is one of five assembly constituencies in the Jhansi Lok Sabha constituency. Since 2008, this assembly constituency is numbered 224 amongst 403 constituencies.

Currently this seat belongs to Bharatiya Janta Party candidate Dr Rashmi Arya who won in last Assembly election of 2022 Uttar Pradesh Legislative Elections defeating Samajwadi Party candidate Tilak Chandra Ahirwar by a margin of	58,595 votes.

Election results

2022

References

External links
 

Assembly constituencies of Uttar Pradesh
Jhansi district